Death of the Format is the seventh studio album by SMP, released on June 11, 2013 by WTII Records.

Reception
DJ Arcanus of Lollipop Magazine gave Death of the Format a mixed review, saying "SMP (Sounds of Mass Production) delivers on the promise of "Metal Madness" with these five minutes of hard driving beats that layer metal aggression (and a delightfully wanky guitar solo) over a dance/industrial skeleton, along the lines of Pain or Rammstein."

Track listing

Personnel
Adapted from the Death of the Format liner notes.

SMP
 Jason Bazinet – lead vocals, drums, programming, production
 Michael Ostrander – programming, production, mixing

Additional performers
 Chris Demarcus – drum programming, guitar, production, mixing
 Dan Miura – guitar
 Jason Porter – vocals (8)
 Benn Tranq – vocals (4)
 Kerry Vink – vocals
 Galen Waling – drums

Production and design
 Wade Alin – mastering
 Bethany Antikajian – photography
 Garrick Antikajian – cover art, design
 Mike Krutz – illustrations

Release history

References

External links 
 Death of the Format at Discogs (list of releases)

2013 albums
SMP (band) albums
WTII Records albums